Metaphysical Dog is the eighth book of collected free verse poems by American poet Frank Bidart. It was published in 2013 by Farrar, Straus and Giroux and won the National Book Critics Circle Award; it was also nominated for the National Book Award in Poetry.

References

2013 poetry books
American poetry collections
Farrar, Straus and Giroux books
National Book Critics Circle Award-winning works